The Delaware Mine is located off U.S. Highway 41,  in Grant Township, Keweenaw County, south of Copper Harbor, Michigan and is a Keweenaw Heritage Site.  The Delaware Copper Mine provides tours of one of the oldest copper mines in the Keweenaw, dating back to 1847. The mine had five shafts, with the deepest reaching . The mine is open June through October and offers guided and self-guided tours.

Gallery

References

External links
 Delaware Mine - official site

Copper mines in Michigan
Keweenaw National Historical Park
Museums in Keweenaw County, Michigan
Mining museums in Michigan